Peter "Sammy" Henderson (18 April 1926 – 24 November 2014) was a New Zealand rugby union and rugby league footballer. He also competed at the 1950 British Empire Games in Auckland, winning a bronze medal in the 4 x 110 yards men's relay.

Biography
Born in Gisborne and educated at Gisborne Boys' High School, Henderson made his provincial rugby union début for Hawke's Bay in 1944. Moving to Wanganui, where he worked as a dental technician, he played rugby union for the Kaierau Club, and 26 representative matches for Wanganui.  He was a member of the ill-fated 1949 All Blacks side, captained by Fred Allen, which lost all four tests on its tour of South Africa. Henderson was top try scorer on the tour, with seven tries.

Henderson excelled in several sports, including sprinting. Following his return from South Africa he had little time to change sports and get into serious sprint training for the 1950 British Empire Games in Auckland. He won a bronze medal as part of the men's 4 x 110 yards relay alongside Kevin Beardsley, Arthur Eustace and Clem Parker. He also competed in the 100 yards where he placed fifth in the final. A medium-sized wing at 1.72 m and 81 kg, Henderson is still credited with being one of the fastest All Blacks of all time, with a time of 9.7 seconds for 100 yards.

Henderson returned to club and representative rugby in Wanganui, playing three tests against the touring British Lions in 1950, and against them for Wanganui. In all, he played 19 matches for the All Blacks, including seven internationals.

Henderson had lost his job while playing in South Africa, so he announced he was headed to England to play in professional rugby league. It was then that the New Zealand Rugby Union banned him from union, a ban which lasted 38 years. He signed with Huddersfield, where he stayed for seven years. He played , i.e. number 2, in Huddersfield's 15–10 victory over St. Helens in the 1953 Challenge Cup Final during the 1952-53 season at Wembley Stadium, London on Saturday 25 April 1953, in front of a crowd of 89,588. He also played for the Other Nationalities side that won the 1953 tri-nations test series against England and France.

Henderson played , i.e. number 2, in Huddersfield's 18–8 victory over Batley in the 1952 Yorkshire County Cup Final during the 1952–53 season at Headingley Rugby Stadium, Leeds on Saturday 15 November 1952.

References

External links
 

1926 births
2014 deaths
Athletes (track and field) at the 1950 British Empire Games
Commonwealth Games bronze medallists for New Zealand
Commonwealth Games medallists in athletics
Expatriate rugby league players in England
Hawke's Bay rugby union players
Huddersfield Giants players
New Zealand expatriate rugby league players
New Zealand expatriate sportspeople in England
New Zealand international rugby union players
New Zealand male sprinters
New Zealand rugby league players
New Zealand rugby union players
Other Nationalities rugby league team players
People educated at Gisborne Boys' High School
Rugby league players from Gisborne, New Zealand
Rugby union players from Gisborne, New Zealand
Rugby union wings
Wanganui rugby union players
Medallists at the 1950 British Empire Games